This is a list of notable events in country music that took place in the year 1978.

Events

 March 4 — The Public Broadcasting System (PBS) telecasts the first complete Grand Ole Opry show from the new Grand Ole Opry House as it happened from 6–9 pm. The show featured Del Reeves, The Willis Brothers, Billy Grammer, Lonzo and Oscar, Bill Monroe, Porter Wagoner, Roy Acuff, The Crook Brothers, The Fruit Jar Drinkers, Ronnie Milsap, Grandpa Jones, George Hamilton IV and others. The show would run over about 18 minutes the first night. The telecast would repeat from 1979 to 1981.
 March 25 — "Mamas Don't Let Your Babies Grow Up to Be Cowboys" by Waylon Jennings and Willie Nelson becomes the last song for 12 years to spend four weeks at No. 1 on Billboards Hot Country Singles chart. There wouldn't be another four-week No. 1 until "Hard Rock Bottom of Your Heart" by Randy Travis in April 1990. The trend of fewer (and shorter) multi-week runs at No. 1 on Billboard, even for the year's biggest hits, is the result of changes in radio programming and the magazine's reporting methods.
 May 6 — Bob Kingsley takes over hosting duties of "American Country Countdown," a stint that will last 27 years. He had been a producer of the radio countdown show since 1974.
 May 24 — The United States Postal Service issues a 13-cent commemorative stamp honoring Jimmie Rodgers, one of the genre's pioneers. The Rodgers stamp, designed by artist Jim Sharpe, is the first in the Postal Service's long-running Performing Arts Series.
 September — The Donna Fargo Show premieres in television syndication|syndication. The new show's debut comes around the same time Fargo was diagnosed with multiple sclerosis. She receives successful medical treatment and with her husband's help, makes it back to excellent health.
 October 4 — One of Nashville's most mysterious crimes involves the reported abduction and beating of Tammy Wynette. Media reports said that Wynette had been abducted by a masked man at a shopping center before the beating. No suspects were ever named or arrested. While Wynette would insist the story was true, her daughter raised doubts, claiming the incident was fabricated to cover physical abuse from her newlywed husband, songwriter/producer George Richey.
 October 21 — Fans of Mel Street are saddened when the honky tonk-styled singer, who had long battled clinical depression and alcoholism, committed suicide on his 43rd birthday. He had signed a recording contract with Mercury Records earlier in the year.

Top hits of the year

Number one hits

United States
(as certified by Billboard)

Notes
1^ No. 1 song of the year, as determined by Billboard.
A^ First Billboard No. 1 hit for that artist.
B^ Last Billboard No. 1 hit for that artist.
C^ Only Billboard No. 1 hit for that artist to date.

Canada
(as certified by RPM)

Notes
1^ No. 1 song of the year, as determined by RPM.
A^ First RPM No. 1 hit for that artist.
B^ Last RPM No. 1 hit for that artist.
C^ Only RPM No. 1 hit for that artist.

Other major hits

Singles released by American artists

Singles released by Canadian artists

Top new album releases

1 A collection of Crystal Gayle's earliest recordings from the early 1970s.

Other albums

Christmas albums
Christmas Card – Statler Brothers (Mercury/Polygram)

Births
February 25 — Shawna Thompson, of Thompson Square.
April 15 — Chris Stapleton, male vocalist who helped revive the blues-soul sound of country music in the 2010s, most notably with the album Traveller.
June 13 – Jason Michael Carroll, late 2000s-to-early 2010s male vocalist best known for "Alyssa Lies."
July 21 — Brad Mates, lead singer of Canadian band Emerson Drive.
July 31 — Zac Brown, lead singer of his eponymously named band, who began having hits in the late 2000s.
September 14 — Danielle Peck, up-and-coming country music star

Deaths
 June 12 — Johnny Bond, 63, singer of the 1940s through 1960s, best known for his novelty songs about drunkenness (heart attack).
 October 21 — Mel Street, 43, honky tonk-styled artist and one of the most promising new artists of the 1970s (suicide).
 October 23 — Maybelle Carter, 69, singer and songwriter of the Carter Family and mother of Anita, Helen and June Carter Cash.
 December 16 — Jenny Lou Carson, 63, first female to write a #1 country hit ("You Two-Timed Me One Time Too Often").

Country Music Hall of Fame Inductees
Grandpa Jones (1913–1998)

Major awards

Grammy AwardsBest Female Country Vocal Performance — "Here You Come Again", Dolly PartonBest Male Country Vocal Performance — "Georgia on My Mind", Willie NelsonBest Country Performance by a Duo or Group with Vocal — "Mamas Don't Let Your Babies Grow Up to Be Cowboys", Waylon Jennings and Willie NelsonBest Country Instrumental Performance — "One O'Clock Jump", Asleep at the WheelBest Country Song — "The Gambler", Don Schlitz (Performer: Kenny Rogers)

Juno AwardsCountry Male Vocalist of the Year — Ronnie ProphetCountry Female Vocalist of the Year — Carroll BakerCountry Group or Duo of the Year — The Good Brothers

Academy of Country MusicEntertainer of the Year — Kenny RogersSong of the Year — "You Needed Me", Randy Goodrum (Performer: Anne Murray)Single of the Year — "Tulsa Time", Don WilliamsAlbum of the Year — Y'all Come Back Saloon, The Oak Ridge BoysTop Male Vocalist — Kenny RogersTop Female Vocalist — Barbara MandrellTop Vocal Group — The Oak Ridge BoysTop New Male Vocalist — John ConleeTop New Female Vocalist — Cristy Lane

Country Music AssociationEntertainer of the Year — Dolly PartonSong of the Year — "Don't It Make My Brown Eyes Blue", Richard Leigh (Performer: Crystal Gayle)Single of the Year — "Heaven's Just a Sin Away", The KendallsAlbum of the Year — It Was Almost Like a Song, Ronnie MilsapMale Vocalist of the Year — Don WilliamsFemale Vocalist of the Year — Crystal GayleVocal Duo of the Year — Kenny Rogers and Dottie WestVocal Group of the Year — The Oak Ridge BoysInstrumentalist of the Year — Roy ClarkInstrumental Group of the Year' — The Oak Ridge Boys Band

Further reading
Kingsbury, Paul, "The Grand Ole Opry: History of Country Music. 70 Years of the Songs, the Stars and the Stories," Villard Books, Random House; Opryland USA, 1995
Kingsbury, Paul, "Vinyl Hayride: Country Music Album Covers 1947–1989," Country Music Foundation, 2003
Millard, Bob, "Country Music: 70 Years of America's Favorite Music," HarperCollins, New York, 1993
Whitburn, Joel, "Top Country Songs 1944–2005 – 6th Edition." 2005.

Other links
Country Music Association
Inductees of the Country Music Hall of Fame

External links
Country Music Hall of Fame

Country
Country music by year